Ramprakash may refer to:

 B. Ramprakash (born 1966), Indian cricketer
 Mark Ramprakash (born 1969), English cricketer
 Ramprakash Mehra (1917–1983), Indian cricketer and administrator
 Ramprakash Rayappa, director and writer of the Tamil films Tamizhuku En Ondrai Azhuthavum (2015) and Pokkiri Raja (2016)

See also
 Ram Prakash (born 1939), Indian politician